Gorini is a surname. Notable people with the surname include:

 Edoardo Gorini (born 1974), Italian football manager and player
 Gianluca Gorini (born 1970), Italian cyclist
 Maddalena Gorini (born 1992), Italian basketball player
 Paolo Gorini (1813–1881), Italian scientist
 Walter Gorini (born 1944), Italian track cyclist